The Women's giant slalom competition of the Sapporo 1972 Olympics was held at Teine on Tuesday, February 8.

The reigning world champion was Betsy Clifford of Canada, while Austria's Annemarie Moser-Pröll was the defending World Cup giant slalom champion and led the current season.

Marie-Theres Nadig of Switzerland, the downhill champion three days earlier, won her second gold medal; Moser-Pröll took another silver, and Austrian compatriot Wiltrud Drexel was the bronze medalist.

Results
The race started at 13:30 JST (UTC+9), and it was snowing.

References 

Women's giant slalom
Alp
Oly
Women's giant slalom